John Englehart or Joseph John Englehart (1867–1915), was an American landscape painter who worked under a number of pseudonyms. Englehart was born on June 14, 1867 in Chicago, Illinois, and died on April 14, 1915 in Oakland, California.

Pseudonyms
John Englehart's numerous variant spellings and pseudonyms include:  
Joseph John Englehart, Joseph John Engelhart, J. Englehart, J. Engelhart, J. Englehardt,  J. Engelhardt, and Emblhart.
C.N. Doughty, C.C. Foucks, C. Williams, C.L. Willis, W.L. Willis, J. Cole, J. Delane, J. Enright, J. Gran, J. Grant, J. Hart, J. Lang, J.L. Monahan, Wm. J. Schon, and Ed Shroder.

Career
Englehart documented America's Western landscape and frontier during the late 19th and early 20th centuries. He was known for his landscape oil paintings of California and the Pacific Northwest.

The style of landscape paintings by Englehart never brought the critical acclaim given to his contemporary landscape painters, such as those of the  Hudson River School, including Albert Bierstadt and Thomas Moran. However he was successful as an artist, and his works are included in the collections of several museums.

California
John Englehart's career started during the popular 'California landscape paintings' period of the latter 19th-century. From the late 1880s until the turn of the century he maintained a studio in San Francisco on Clay Street. During those prosperous years he commuted to work from a residence across the San Francisco Bay in Oakland. He painted scenes of California, including various views of Yosemite Valley.

Pacific Northwest
Tacoma
In the late 1890s Englehart traveled and painted in the Pacific Northwest. He did many landscapes of the Tacoma, Washington area during this period.

Portland
In 1902, after San Francisco's art patrons' taste had moved on to European art, he opened a studio in Portland, Oregon. He spent a large part of his time there until 1904. He participated in the Lewis and Clark Centennial Exposition in 1905.

In 1909, he was awarded a prize for a landscape painting in a New York exhibit.

San Francisco Bay area
By 1910 Englehart had returned to the Bay Area, where he resided in Alameda near Oakland, until his death on April 14, 1915.

Realism style
John Englehart's style was Realism, focusing on being illustrative and descriptive. He did not emphasize an evocative or romantic style, such as Thomas Hill did, to paint "Not as it is, but as it ought to be." Englehart's landscape compositions had a goal to bring the viewer closer to an actual experience of 'being there.' For most of his paintings he avoided effets de soir, choosing the midday light over the 'romantic light' of sunrise and sunset. He also incorporated multiple viewpoints in his paintings to depict the scene.

See also

California Tonalism
Luminism (American art style)
Realism (arts)
American realism
Romanticism (arts)

Selected works

Museum collections
Oakland Museum of California.
Washington State Historical Society.
College of Notre Dame, in Belmont, California.
De Young Museum, on loan to the Society of California Pioneers, San Francisco.
Nevada Museum, Reno.
The historic Baldwin Saloon (large collection), The Dalles, Oregon.

Unrelated artists
Englehart used many pseudonyms, however there are other similarly named artists, including:
Josef Engelhart — European oil painter.
Charles Montagu Doughty — poet.
Edna Palmer Engelhardt — oil painter.
Walter Albert Engelhardt — oil painter.
LeRoy Updyke (1876–1959) — copied Englehart in paintings for the tourist trade, University Of Washington painting instructor.

References
Hughes, Edan Artists in California 1786-1940
Falk Who Was Who in American Art
Dawdy Artists of the American West
Taylor, Mrs. H. J. Yosemite Indians and Other Sketches (1936)

Notes

1867 births
1915 deaths
American landscape painters
American realist painters
Artists from the San Francisco Bay Area
19th-century American painters
American male painters
20th-century American painters
Artists of the American West
19th-century American male artists
20th-century American male artists